Edward Jans (born 17 August 1946) is a Canadian former sports shooter. He competed in the 50 metre pistol event at the 1972 Summer Olympics.

References

1946 births
Living people
Canadian male sport shooters
Olympic shooters of Canada
Shooters at the 1972 Summer Olympics
Sportspeople from Medicine Hat
Sportspeople from Alberta
Commonwealth Games medallists in shooting
Commonwealth Games silver medallists for Canada
Shooters at the 1978 Commonwealth Games
Pan American Games medalists in shooting
Pan American Games gold medalists for Canada
Pan American Games silver medalists for Canada
Shooters at the 1975 Pan American Games
Shooters at the 1979 Pan American Games
20th-century Canadian people
Medallists at the 1978 Commonwealth Games